Carlos Francisco Leppe Arroyo (October 9, 1952 – October 15, 2015) was notable as a Chilean performance artist. Carlos Leppe's artistic career began with conventional plastic media, but he is recognised as a major exponent, and the originator, of performance art in Chile. The practice of performance art is also known in Chile as  'art actions' (acciones de arte). Leppe used his own body in an artistic practice born of the tension between personal self-identity and the cultural expectations which regulate social behaviour. He was a key figure in the neo-avant-garde ‘Advanced Scene’ (or Escena de Avanzada), which included—among others—the artists Carlos Altamirano, Juan Castillo, Juan Domingo Dávila, Alfredo Jaar and Lotty Rosenfeld, and the writers Diamela Eltit and Raúl Zurita.

Biography and context 
Leppe completed his artistic training at the University of Chile, graduating with a specialism in painting. He studied under the tutelage of the visual artists Carlos Altamirano, Eugenio Dittborn and Francisco Smythe and the French-Chilean theorist Nelly Richard, who considered him among the Escena de Avanzada, or 'Advanced Scene' of neo-avant-garde artists. Leppe took inspiration from a number of twentieth-century avant-garde artists, among them Arman, Christo, Joseph Beuys, Lucio Fontana and George Segal. He is associated with object art, body art, and spatial interventions. His career encompassed various roles as art director, image consultant and creative consultant for a number of Chilean, Italian and Spanish companies, including being the director and artistic producer of the national television channel, TVN (Televisión Nacional de Chile).

The early years of the military dictatorship of Augusto Pinochet (1973–1990) generated some of the most deeply critical work in Chilean art. According to Concha Calvo Salanova, “Leppe used the reference points of Conceptualism, such as its hermeticism and precariousness to demonstrate the absolute breakdown of human rights in an extremely repressive dictatorship.” Using his own body, Leppe's actions took aim at social and political injustices suffered under dictatorship, such as the use of torture. An example can be seen in the photo-performance El perchero (The Clothes Rack, 1975), in which the theme of gender, a central axis of his critical vision, was also foregrounded. Calvo Salanova sees the piece as “confront[ing] the question of the representation of living flesh, in a clear reference to tortures used by the Chilean military regime.”

Notable works 

 The Happening of the Hens (El happening de las gallinas), 1974, body action
 The Clothes Rack (El perchero), 1975, installation
 Star Action (Acción de la estrella), 1979, body action
 The Singers (Las cantatrices), 1980, video action
 Waiting Room (Sala de espera), 1980, installation
 Twenty-four Hour Illumination (Iluminación durante veinticuatro horas), 1980, installation
 Artist's Proof (Prueba de artista), 1981, body action
 Pietà (La Pietá), 1982, body action
 Artist's Proof (Épreuve d'artiste), 1982, body action
 The Nightingale and the Rose (El ruiseñor y la rosa), 1985, video action
 Mary the Second (María Segundo), 1986, installation
 Chile Lives (Chile vive), 1987, installation
Plastic Surgery (Cirugía plástica), 1989, body action
The Shoes (Los zapatos), 2000, body action
Material Fatigue (Fatiga de material), 2001, body action
I Am Badly in Love (Soy el mal enamorado), 2002, body action

References 

20th-century Chilean male artists
21st-century Chilean male artists
Chilean performance artists

1952 births
2015 deaths